Alfredo Nicolás Guevara (born February 1, 1982 in Mar del Plata) is a former Argentine footballer who last played for River Plate of the Uruguayan Primera División.

Teams
  San Lorenzo 2000–2004
  Nueva Chicago 2004–2005
  Huracán 2005
  San Martín de Mendoza 2006
  Douglas Haig 2007
  San Martín de Mendoza 2008
  Temperley 2008–2009
  Rampla Juniors 2009–2010
  Liverpool 2011
  Rampla Juniors 2011
  Cerro Largo 2012
  Rampla Juniors 2012–2013
  River Plate 2013–2015

References
 Profile at BDFA 

1982 births
Living people
Argentine footballers
Argentine expatriate footballers
San Lorenzo de Almagro footballers
Nueva Chicago footballers
Club Atlético Huracán footballers
San Martín de Mendoza footballers
Rampla Juniors players
Liverpool F.C. (Montevideo) players
Uruguayan Primera División players
Expatriate footballers in Uruguay

Association footballers not categorized by position
Sportspeople from Mar del Plata